The Follett House is a historic house at 63 College Street in Burlington, Vermont.  Built in 1840 for a prominent local businessman, it is the last surviving grand 19th-century lakeside mansion in the city, and one of the state's finest examples of Greek Revival architecture.  It was listed on the National Register of Historic Places in 1972.  It has seen commercial and institutional uses since 1885.

Description and history
The Follett House stands prominently overlooking Burlington's waterfront, at the southwest corner of college and South Champlain Streets.  The house is oriented facing west toward Lake Champlain, with a terraced lawn extending westward to Battery Street.  It is a -story brick structure, with a gabled roof, clapboarded exterior, and stone foundation.  The main facade is five bays wide, with a projecting Greek temple front with five fluted Doric columns supporting an entablature and gabled pediment.  Ground floor windows are long behind the temple front, and the second floor has a balcony stretching across its width.  A secondary entrance on the north side (facing College Street) is sheltered by a portico.  The roof is adorned by a square cupola which was added in the 1880s.

The house was built in 1840 for Timothy Follett (1793-1857), a real estate developer and later a railroad executive.  It was designed by Ammi B. Young, whose other credits include the Vermont State House.  Follett lost his fortune in the 1850s when the Rutland Railroad went bankrupt, and the house was owned by a series of executives, ending with Dr. B.S. Nichols, a local industrialist.  Since 1885 the house has had a variety of institutional owners, including the local chapter of the Veterans of Foreign Wars.  It is one of the state's finest examples of Greek Revival architecture, and is that last surviving mansion of a series that once stood facing the waterfront.

See also

National Register of Historic Places listings in Chittenden County, Vermont

References

Houses on the National Register of Historic Places in Vermont
National Register of Historic Places in Burlington, Vermont
Greek Revival architecture in Vermont
Houses completed in 1840